Charlie Walker (born 23 December 1992) is an English rugby union winger who plays for the RFU Championship side Ealing Trailfinders.

Early life

Walker attended Stoneygate School then Oakham School where he played at Fly Half and captained the 1st XV which reached the final of the NatWest Schools Cup in 2011 and ultimately lost to Whitgift School 45-24. Walker played alongside current Scottish flanker Hamish Watson. Walker also played for the England U20 side.

Professional Playing Career

Walker moved from the Leicester Tigers to Harlequin F.C. in 2011 after finishing his A-levels  because he had grown unhappy with the Leicester Academy after they had wanted him to leave Oakham to join another closer Leicester school with official links to the Tiger's Academy. Walker was quoted as saying "“I did not think I’d enjoy things if I moved. If you are not enjoying it you are not going to play well, so I stayed at school and joined Quins full-time after I left.".
He played for Zebre in 2019-20 Pro14 season.

Ahead of the 2020-21 RFU Championship Season, Walker signed for Ealing Trailfinders, a team he had briefly signed for on loan before breaking into the Harlequins first team.

Walker played for the England 7s in Hong Kong and Japan during the 2013 Circuit.

References 

1992 births
Living people
Ealing Trailfinders Rugby Club players
English rugby union players
Harlequin F.C. players
Rugby union players from Leicester
Rugby union centres